= Full Metal Planète =

Sci-fi strategy board game

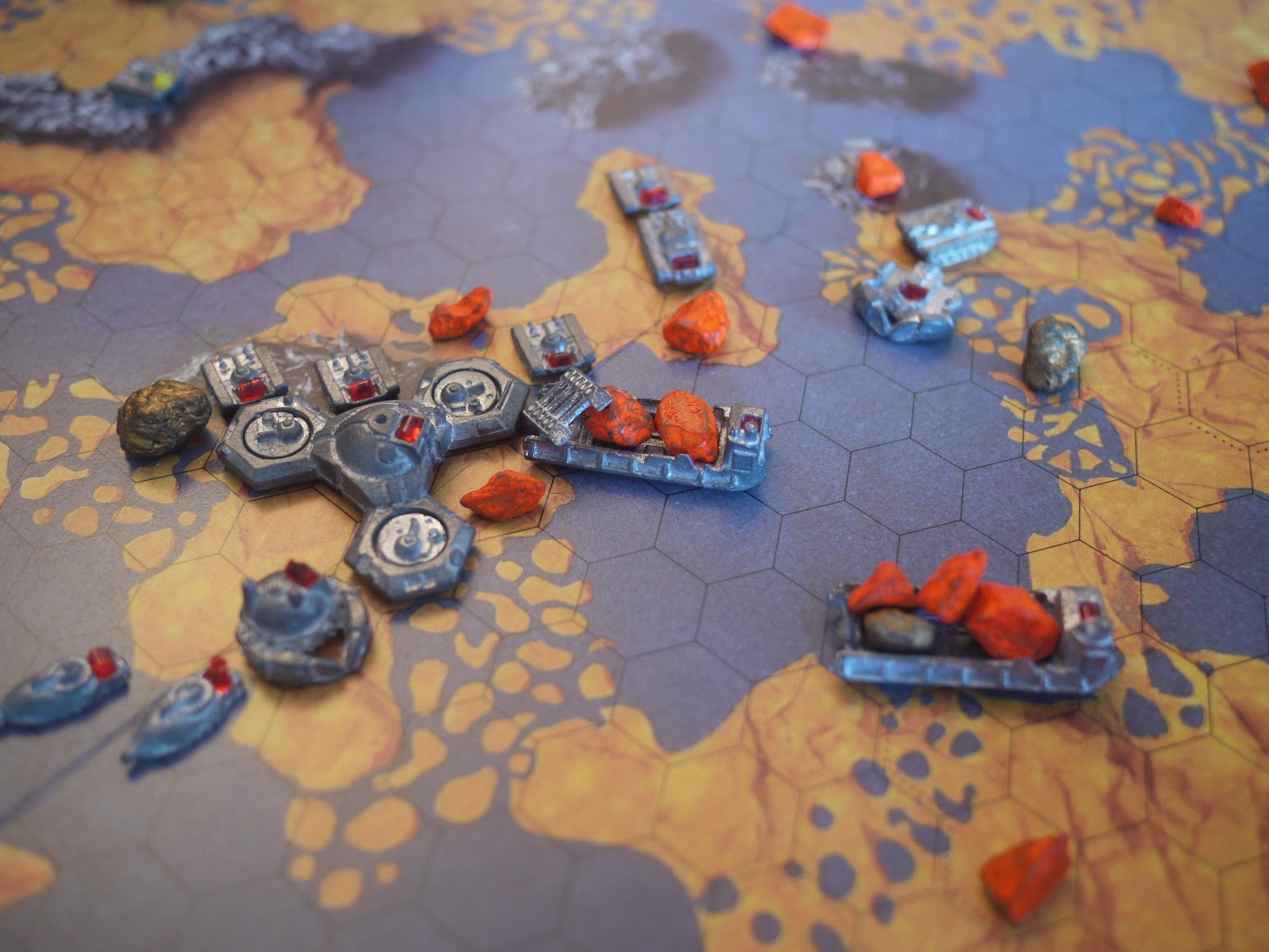
- Designers: Joseph Reiser
- Illustrators: Gérard Delfanti; Gérard Mathieu; Pascal Trigaux
- Publishers: Ludodélire
- Publication: 1988; 38 years ago
- Genres: Strategy game
- Languages: English
- Players: 2-4
- Playing time: 90 minutes
- Age range: 12+

Full Metal Planète is a board game designed by Gérard Delfanti, Gérard Mathieu, and Pascal Trigaux and published in 1988 by Ludodélire. Players play as mining companies on the Full Metal Planet, a planet which is rich in mining resources, but also unstable. They try to amass the maximum amount of ore and evacuate it into orbit before the destruction of the planet, thwarting other players and dealing with the destructive tides of the planet.

A video game version was developed by Infogrames (now Atari SA) and published by Data East in 1989.

== Gameplay ==
The ore is placed on the whole board, every three squares, except on the sea squares. Players attempt to collect as much ore as possible and evacuate their spaceship before the planet collapses. Starting the game, each company has:

- an immovable spaceship that acts as its base camp where ore and devices are brought and is equipped with three gun turrets. The spacecraft must take off before the destruction of the planet on the last turn;
- a "Crab" ore collection and transport device;
- a barge for transporting ore and land units over water;
- five tanks to ensure the protection of the machines against the other companies;
- two maritime launchers equipped with a cannon;
- a "weather-laying machine" that players can use to determine the evolution of the tides and to manufacture parts from ore;
- a pontoon that allows land vehicles to move to a sea space if still in contact with a land piece.

The game is played over 25 rounds, the first two of which are for landing and initial piece placement. From the third round onward, each player has "action points" depending on the round number they can use to play. Actions such as moving a square, picking up or unloading a mineral or a part, exiting or reentering a machine in the spacecraft, creating a part with the weather-laying machine, or capturing another player's spaceship cost one action point, while actions such as destructive fire or repairing a captured spaceship's turret cost two. A player can also save up to ten action points to use later. Each player must take their turn in a maximum of three minutes, and no action can be undone.

Barges and Crabs can transport ores or coins under their maximum carry capacities. Loading and unloading cannot be done from or towards squares threatened by enemy fire. New vehicles can be synthesized using ores in the weather laying machine.

Tides (low, normal, or high) are determined by drawing shuffled cards at random. Depending on the tides, the tidal zones are dry or submerged, thus becoming terrestrial or maritime. At the start of each round, players with an operational weather layer can check the next round's tide. If a land piece is ever on a sea space or if a nautical piece is ever on a land space, it can no longer act or be transported until a favourable tide occurs.

Destroyers such as vessels, tanks, "Big Heaps", and spacecraft turrets can fire twice per turn with shots reaching two or three squares depending on the type. It takes the simultaneous firing of two destroyers to destroy a piece and opposing pieces can not move into squares in this range. If two destroyers come into contact with an opposing piece, they can capture it. If the three spacecraft turrets are destroyed, an opposing piece can capture the spacecraft. The player is then eliminated, and their pieces pass to the capturer. The conqueror also receives five additional action points to move their pieces and the pieces of the captured spacecraft. If a player captures all opposing spacecraft, that players is the winner.

On the 21st turn, each player decides whether their spacecraft takes off at the start of the turn or waits until the 25th turn to take off. Spaceships taking off on the 25th turn do so at the end of their movements and must spend 1-4 action points, depending on the number of turrets not destroyed, to take off. Each ore on board the spacecraft gives two points, each piece gives one point, pieces and ores left on the planet are lost. The player with the highest score wins.

== Reception ==
Mike Siggins reviewed Full Metal Planète for Games International magazine, and gave it 4 stars out of 5, and stated that "This is a neat, original game and, although a little costly, it is well worth it."

== Reviews ==
- Jeux & Stratégie #54
- Casus Belli #47
