= Full Metal Planet =

1989 video game

- Developer(s): Infogrames
- Publisher(s): Data East
- Platform(s): MS-DOS, Classic Mac OS, Amiga
- Release: 1989
- Genre(s): Turn-based strategy

Full Metal Planet is a 1989 video game published by Data East based on the board game Full Metal Planète.

== Gameplay ==
Full Metal Planet is a game in which the player commands a mining freighter competing for the ore of a planet.

== Reception ==
Mike Siggins reviewed Full Metal Planete for Games International magazine, and gave it 4 stars out of 5, and stated that "I can certainly think of no better company to tackle the conversion of Full Metal Planete and they have done a fine job. I am not sure of the merits of owning the boardgame as well as the computer game but they are both worthy products and, for once, the computer version is cheaper than the boardgame!."

Roger White reviewed the game for Computer Gaming World, and stated that "Full Metal Planet offers a viable choice for gamers looking for a multi-player strategy game on the computer, a challenging game which can require from a short to medium amount of time to complete and a game that does not follow tried and true formulas of game design."

Keith Ferrell for Compute! said that "Within its own context, Full Metal Planet is a solid strategy game. It would be interesting to see what its designers could do with the game's engine by way of offering different planetary surfaces and types. It certainly has potential for creating the basis for a much larger games."
